A penumbral lunar eclipse will take place on August 29, 2053.

This eclipse is a relatively rare total penumbral lunar eclipse wherein the entire moon passes through the Earth's penumbra without any portion entering the umbra. This eclipse will be the first total penumbral lunar eclipse since the March 2006 lunar eclipse.

This lunar eclipse will be followed by the solar eclipse of September 12, 2053.

Visibility 
The entire eclipse will be visible in most of North America, Central America, and the western half of South America. Part of the eclipse will be visible in the remainder of North and South America, Oceania, far-eastern Asia, western Africa, and far-western Europe.

Related lunar eclipses 
This lunar eclipse is part of Lunar Saros 119.

Half-Saros cycle
A lunar eclipse will be preceded and followed by solar eclipses by 9 years and 5.5 days (a half saros). This lunar eclipse is related to two solar eclipses of Solar Saros 126.

See also 
List of lunar eclipses and List of 21st-century lunar eclipses

References

External links 
 

2053-08
2053-08
2053 in science